Branko D. Kovačević (born  29 June 1951) is a Serbian academic. He served as the rector of the University of Belgrade from 2006 to 2012.

Education and career
He received the B.Sc., M.Sc., and Ph.D. degrees from the University of Belgrade Faculty of Electrical Engineering in 1975, 1980, and 1984, respectively. He is currently a full professor of the Faculty of Electrical Engineering, University of Belgrade, teaching courses in control
systems theory and its applications.

He is the President of ETRAN Section for Automatic Control, the President of ETRAN Program committee, and the Editor in chief of the Journal of Automatic Control (published by the Belgrade University Press).

In December 2006, he became rector of the University of Belgrade. He stayed on that position until September 2012, and later returned to his former dean office of the Faculty of Electrical Engineering.

In 2014, he was named the President of the Supervisory Board of Elektroprivreda Srbije (EPS).

Honours and awards
He was awarded:
 The Engineers Prize of the Economic Council of Belgrade
 The Dušan Mitosis Prize of the Yugoslav Society of Electrical Engineers (ETRAN)
 The Branko Raković Prize of the Faculty of Electrical Engineering
 The Outstanding Research Prize of the Institute of Applied Mathematics and Electronics
 The Teaching Prize of the University Students Council.

References

External links
INTERVIEW: Dr. Branko Kovacevic, Rector of the University of Belgrade 

1951 births
Living people
Serbian engineers
Academic staff of the University of Belgrade
Rectors of the University of Belgrade
University of Belgrade School of Electrical Engineering alumni